Hopsewee Plantation, also known as the Thomas Lynch, Jr., Birthplace or Hopsewee-on-the-Santee, is a plantation house built in 1735 near Georgetown, South Carolina.  It was the birthplace of Thomas Lynch, Jr., a Founding Father who was a signer of the Declaration of Independence, and served as a Lowcountry rice plantation. Before he departed for his ill-fated voyage he made a will, which stipulated that heirs of his female relatives must change their surname to Lynch in order to inherit the family estate, a rice plantation. He was taken ill at the end of 1779 and he sailed, with his wife, for St. Eustatius in the West Indies. Their ship disappeared at sea in a storm and was never found. The family estate, Hopsewee, still stands in South Carolina. The Lynch family sold the house in 1752 to Robert Hume whose son, John Hume, lived at Hopsewee in the winter after inheriting it. Upon his death in 1841, his own son, John Hume Lucas, inherited the house. John Hume Lucas died in 1853. Like many Santee plantations, it was abandoned during the Civil War. After the war, rice was never planted again, but the Lucas family continued to occupy Hopsewee until 1925. In September 1949, Col. and Mrs. Wilkinson bought the house and occupied it.

According to the National Park Service, "the frame building, a fine example of a Carolina low country; referred to as (Low Country.) after the War of 1812;  plantation house, showing West Indian influence, with its double-tiered piazza and dormered hip roof." The house is made of black cypress and rests on a brick foundation which forms a cellar. The house is forty feet wide and fifty feet deep. Each floor has four rooms with a central hall. The piazzas were added in 1845 and replace an earlier verandah.

It was declared a National Historic Landmark in 1971.

It is located about 13 miles south of Georgetown on U.S. Highway 17, in the vicinity of North Santee on the North Santee River.

The house continues to be a private residence, but is open to the public for tours.  It is furnished with 18th and 19th century period furniture.

See also
List of National Historic Landmarks in South Carolina
National Register of Historic Places listings in Georgetown County, South Carolina

References

External links

Official Hopsewee Plantation website
Hopsewee, Georgetown County (U.S. Hwy. 17, North Santee vicinity), at South Carolina Department of Archives and History

Plantation houses in South Carolina
Houses in Georgetown County, South Carolina
Historic house museums in South Carolina
Museums in Georgetown County, South Carolina
Biographical museums in South Carolina
Houses completed in 1735
Houses on the National Register of Historic Places in South Carolina
National Historic Landmarks in South Carolina
National Register of Historic Places in Georgetown County, South Carolina
Historic American Buildings Survey in South Carolina
Slave cabins and quarters in the United States
Homes of United States Founding Fathers